Robin Talley is an American author of young adult books.

Talley has worked as a communications strategist for nonprofit organizations "focusing on educational equity, gay rights, women's rights, and beyond". Her novels feature racially diverse and LGBTQ+ characters.

Awards 
Talley won the inaugural Amnesty CILIP Honour for her first novel, Lies We Tell Ourselves, in 2014; the same novel was shortlisted for the CILIP Carnegie Medal and the Lambda Literary Award.

Her second novel, What We Left Behind, was included on the American Library Association's Rainbow List.

Her third novel, As I Descended, was shortlisted for the 2016 Kirkus Prize.

Bibliography

Novels 
 Lies We Tell Ourselves (Harlequin Teen, 2014) 
 What We Left Behind (Harlequin Teen, 2015) 
 As I Descended (HarperTeen, 2016) 
 Our Own Private Universe (Harlequin Teen, 2017) 
  Pulp (2018) 
The Love Curse of Melody McIntyre (HarperTeen, 2020) 
Music from another world (Inkyard Press, 2020)

Short stories 
 "The Whole World is Watching" in A Tyranny of Petticoats: 15 Stories of Belles, Bank Robbers and Other Badass Girls, edited by Jessica Spotswood (Candlewick Press, 2016)
 "The Legend of Stone Mary" in Toil & Trouble: 15 Tales of Women & Witchcraft, edited by Jessica Spotswood and Tess Sharpe (Harlequin Teen, 2018)

References

External links 

 Robin Talley's Website

21st-century American novelists
American young adult novelists
Lambda Literary Award winners
Living people
American LGBT writers
Year of birth missing (living people)
Place of birth missing (living people)